Heidi Foss is a Canadian actor, comedian, and writer. In 2001 she won a Canadian Comedy Awards honoring her achievements in the field of comedy writing for the Canadian television comedy program This Hour Has 22 Minutes.

Her film and television credits include:
 Arthur - Mary Moo Cow/Patty Jones (voice role)
 Fries with That? - actress/ writer
 Obsessed (a 2002 TV drama directed by John Badham) as a prison guard
 Misguided Angels
 In Thru The Out Door
 Doctor*ology
 Fix and Foxi
 Timothy Goes to School
 Radio Active
 She's So Funny - writer/performer
 Funny Girls - writer/performer

Foss has appeared on Comedy Now!, the Just for Laughs television show, 
Daily Planet, Dr. Katz, Professional Therapist,  and The Mike Bullard Show. 
 
She has provided her voice talents to the animated shows Arthur, Buster, and Ripley's Believe It Or Not.

References

External links
 
 https://web.archive.org/web/20080828043826/http://www.heidifoss.com/HF-media.htm

Canadian television writers
Canadian women television writers
Canadian women comedians
Living people
Year of birth missing (living people)
Place of birth missing (living people)
Canadian women screenwriters
Canadian Comedy Award winners